Devon Jersild (born August 25, 1958) is a clinical psychologist, author and screenwriter.

Biography
Devon Jersild was born August 25, 1958. She graduated summa cum laude from Dartmouth College, and was awarded a 
master's degree by the Bread Loaf School of English, and a doctorate in clinical psychology by Fielding Graduate University.

Jersild was president of The Vermont Association for Psychoanalytic Studies from 2019 to 2021. Prior to becoming a psychologist, Jersild was the associate director of the Bread Loaf Writers' Conference, Associate Editor of the New England Review, and a visiting Lecturer in English at Middlebury College. Her essays and stories have appeared in such publications as The New York Times, The Kenyon Review, USA Today, Redbook, and Glamour Magazine.

She won an O. Henry Award in 1991 for her short story "In Which John Imagines His Mind as a Pond." Andre Dubus III wrote in the Los Angeles Times: "Jersild's language is cool and spare, her details muted, a style that serves her heart-thumping main character well, taking him, and us, to an ending that unfolds itself naturally, with a deliberate and excusable echo of James Joyce's The Dead." She is the author of Happy Hours: Alcohol in a Woman’s Life (HarperCollins), and has lectured widely on the subject of alcohol, as well as appearing on television shows, including The Oprah Winfrey Show and The Montel Williams Show. Jay Parini and Jersild adapted Parini's historical novel Benjamin's Crossing into a screenplay, which is currently in pre-production.

She is married to the writer Jay Parini; they have three sons, and live in Vermont.

Awards
1991, O. Henry Award

References

External links
 

Living people
1958 births
American women writers
21st-century American psychologists
21st-century American women
20th-century American psychologists